Russian Standard  is a major Russian company producing the vodka brand of the same name. The brand was founded by Roustam Tariko in 1998.

History
The brand was introduced as the "Russian Standard" vodka in 1998 by the Russian Standard company of Roustam Tariko.

Two years after a successful Russian market launch, international expansion was started. This was accompanied by the launch of Russian Standard Platinum product in 2001 and the luxury brand Imperia in 2004. The original product was re-christened Original.

In 2006, a new distillery with 4 million cases/yr capacity was opened in Saint Petersburg.

In response to the 2022 Russian invasion of Ukraine, the company was hit by several retail boycotts on Russian-branded vodka. Some legislations also adopted boycott policies. On 26 February 2022, Ohio governor Mike DeWine announced that he had directed the Ohio Department of Commerce to "cease both the purchase & sale of all vodka made by Russian Standard". On 11 March, U.S. president Joe Biden issued an executive order blocking U.S. imports of key Russian products, including vodka, and banning exports of high-end goods to Russia. In the United Kingdom, the supermarket chains Sainsbury's, Morrisons, Co-op Food and Aldi removed Russian Standard vodka from their shelves.

Market position
In a 2006 overview of Russian premium vodkas for Vanity Fair, the "Imperia" product stood alone with a top A+ grade.

Production
Production of the Russian Standard Original is based on a four-step protocol:
mashing and fermenting
distillation and rectification
filtration and relaxation
bottling and packaging.

Higher-end products add more purification steps.

Winter grain from Russian steppes is milled and fermented.

The spirits are blended with water from Lake Ladoga. The proximity of Lake Ladoga was one of the main reasons for the company's decision to establish its distillery in Saint Petersburg. The lake's underground sources provide one of the softest waters naturally available.

The product is then filtered four times through charcoal.

Mendeleev myth
The marketing claims that, "In 1894, Dmitri Mendeleev, the greatest scientist in all Russia, received the decree to set the Imperial quality standard for Russian vodka and the 'Russian Standard' was born", or that the vodka is "compliant with the highest quality of Russian vodka approved by the royal government commission headed by Mendeleev in 1894."

This, however, is based on a popular myth that Mendeleev's 1865 doctoral dissertation "A Discourse on the combination of alcohol and water" contained a statement that 38% is the ideal strength of vodka, and that this number was later rounded to 40% to simplify the calculation of alcohol tax. However, Mendeleev's dissertation was about alcohol concentrations over 70% and he never wrote anything about vodka. Furthermore, the 40% standard strength was introduced by the Russian government already in 1843, when Mendeleev was nine years old.

Variants
 Russian Standard Vodka
 Original product launched in 1998
 Raw ingredients: winter grains from Russian Steppes, glacial water from Lake Ladoga
 Distilled four times and filtered four times through charcoal
 Russian Standard Gold
 Notes of vanilla, caramel, and spearmint
 Added ingredient Siberian ginseng extract
 Russian Standard Platinum
 Higher-end product, launched 2001
 Filtered additional two times through silver.
 Imperial
 The luxury brand, launched 2004
 Distilled additional four times.
 Filtered additional two times through quartz.

See also

List of vodkas

References

External links

 

Russian vodkas
Russian brands
Alcoholic drink brands